The 2016 South Carolina Gamecocks football team represented the University of South Carolina in the 2016 NCAA Division I FBS football season. The Gamecocks played their home games at Williams-Brice Stadium in Columbia, South Carolina and competed in the East Division of the Southeastern Conference (SEC). The Gamecocks first-year head coach was Will Muschamp, with Kurt Roper as offensive coordinator and Travaris Robinson as defensive coordinator. They finished the season 6–7, 3–5 in SEC play to finish in fifth place in the East Division. They were invited to the Birmingham Bowl where they lost to South Florida in overtime.

Schedule
South Carolina announced its 2016 football schedule on October 29, 2015. The 2016 schedule consisted of seven home and five away games in the regular season. The Gamecocks hosted SEC foes Georgia, Missouri, Tennessee, and Texas A&M, and traveled to Florida, Kentucky, Mississippi State, and Vanderbilt.

For the tenth year, the Gamecocks opened their season on a Thursday. The team hosted three out of four of its non–conference games which were against Clemson (from the ACC), East Carolina (from the American), Massachusetts (from the MAC), and Western Carolina (from the Southern Conference).

The game between South Carolina and Georgia on October 8, 2016, was postponed due to Hurricane Matthew, and was rescheduled the following day on October 9, 2016.
Schedule Source:

Roster

References

South Carolina
South Carolina Gamecocks football seasons
South Carolina Gamecocks football